The 2010–11 season was the 100th season in Hajduk Split's history and their twentieth in the Prva HNL. Their second-place finish in the 2009–10 season meant it was their 20th successive season playing in the Prva HNL. It was the third tenure for manager Stanko Poklepović at Hajduk, after he was appointed following Edoardo Reja's departure to Lazio in February 2010. Poklepović won the Croatian Cup's previous season, his third silverware. The season covers a period from 1 June 2010 to 31 May 2011.

There were no arrivals during the pre-season transfer window, with players leaving the club or reducing their contractual obligations to ease the club's financial situation. The season started with an eleven-match unbeaten league run, but after three successive defeats in all three competitions during the October, Poklepović was sacked. Youth team coach Goran Vučević was appointed as caretaker manager and eventually signed a two-and-a-half-year contract in December. A four-match run without victory, which started with a defeat by rivals Dinamo Zagreb that diminished hope for a championship title, saw Vučević leaving the club on mutual consent. Ante Miše was appointed as his successor until the end of the season, in which time he won two out of five remaining matches. Hajduk finished the season in 2nd place in the Prva HNL behind Dinamo Zagreb for the third consecutive time. The board of directors chose not to extend the contract of Miše, and at the end of May, Krasimir Balakov was appointed as new manager.

The club reached the group stage of the UEFA Europa League, eliminating Dinamo Bucharest and Unirea Urziceni in progress. They finished in the last place, winning only one match, against Anderlecht. Hajduk reached the second round of the Croatian Cup, where the team were beaten 1–0 in the extra time by Istra 1961. Ante Vukušić was the club's top goalscorer after scoring 18 goals, with 14 in the league and four in the Europe.

Background

Manager Edoardo Reja left Hajduk ten days before the start of the second part of the season with the team in 7th place, after he accepted the offer to manage Lazio. Stanko Poklepović was appointed as his successor, and led the team to a 2nd-place finish in the Prva HNL. Hajduk also won the Croatian Cup for the fifth time after defeating Šibenik in the final with an aggregate score 4–1. As the Cup winners they will enter Europa League campaign in the third qualifying round. After their contracts ended, Josip Skoko left to Australia to play for Melbourne Heart and Goran Rubil was signed by the Greek team Asteras Tripoli.

Review

Pre-season
Hajduk Split opened their pre-season campaign with a 1–1 draw against Shanghai Shenhua, which was headed by former Hajduk manager Miroslav Blažević. They continued their tour of Slovenia and Austria, and won their first friendly game 5–4 against Austrian team Tondach Gleinstätten. On 30 July, Hajduk saw their first defeat in a friendly game. Slovenian team Domžale beat them 3–1, while Mirko Oremuš scored their only goal and Senijad Ibričić earned a direct red card. A 2–0 victory over Mura 05 saw midfielder Oremuš suffer an injury, but he returned to training after a week of absence.  Their final game in the pre-season campaign, against Hamburger SV, ended as a 3–3 draw, with two goals from Ibričić. The game was played at Poljud in front of an attendance of 15,000 to commemorate 30 years after their quarter final match in 1979–80 European Cup which Hajduk won 3–2 but failed to advance in the semifinals due to away goals rule.

Hajduk's pre-season was busy with transfer activity, with players only leaving the club as Hajduk needed to get rid of financial ballast from last season. Hrvoje Vejić and Marijan Buljat agreed on reducing their contractual obligations, while Ivo Smoje and Ivan Rodić were released to Osijek and Rijeka, respectively. Dario Jertec refused to cut down his salary, and terminated his contract after playing only two games last season. Goalkeeper Vjekoslav Tomić and midfielder Florin Cernat left to Turkish Karabükspor, where they were soon joined by Anthony Šerić. Boris Pandža left Hajduk for €350,000 and signed a three-year contract with Belgian Mechelen.

July and August
Hajduk played against Dinamo Zagreb in the Croatian Supercup at Maksimir on 17 July. They lost 1–0, Igor Bišćan scored the winner 13 minutes from full-time. Hajduk's season started with a 6–1 victory over Istra 1961 on 24 July 2010. After the first half there was already 5–1, with five different players contributing to the score. Senijad Ibričić scored the sixth goal from a penalty kick. Hajduk started their European season with a 3–1 defeat away to Dinamo Bucharest. Second-half substitute Marin Tomasov scored the only goal for Hajduk. During the game Marin Ljubičić suffered a broken zygomatic bone. He underwent a surgery and is expected to be at least three months out of action. Only a few days later another injury hit Hajduk; Marijan Buljat broke a leg during the training meaning he would be out of action for six months.

First day of August brought the second league game which resulted in a 2–2 away draw against Osijek, with Ibričić scoring a late equalizer from a penalty kick. Same player was awarded with Heart of Hajduk on 4 August. In the second leg of Europa League qualifications Hajduk defeated Dinamo Bucharest 3–0 with goals from Vukušić, Brkljača and Tomasov. With an aggregate score 4–3 Hajduk advanced to the Europa League play-off round where they will meet another Romanian representative, Unirea Urziceni. On 8 August, Hajduk won the game against Šibenik 2–0 with goals from Vukušić and Ibričić. Same day, Mario Tičinović was loaned out to Karlovac for the remainder of the season. Hajduk took over the first place on the league table after 5–0 away win over Inter Zaprešić, with Vukušić again in the score line. On 19 August in front of the sold out Poljud, Hajduk beat Unirea Urziceni 4–1 with goals from Ibričić, Brkljača and Čop giving the team victory after being one goal down. Hajduk beat Zadar 4–1 in the next league game, again being one goal down. In the second leg of Europa League play-off, Ante Vukušić scored a late equalizing goal for a 1–1 away draw, and an aggregate 5–2 win against Unirea Urziceni. Hajduk entered the group stage of Europa League and was drawn in the group G along with Zenit St. Petersburg, Anderlecht and AEK Athens. After 50 years, Hajduk played in a local derby against RNK Split as they were promoted to top flight this season. The game was played at sold out Park Mladeži and ended with a 1–1 draw, with Vukušić scoring his sixth league goal.

September
Start of September was reserved for UEFA Euro 2012 qualifying games. Goalkeeper Danijel Subašić, defenders Ivan Strinić and Jurica Buljat received call-up to the Croatian team for their UEFA Euro 2012 qualifying games against Latvia and Greece, but Subašić was replaced after experiencing problems with knee injury. Strinić played the entire game in the 3–0 win over Latvia, and also in a goalless draw with Greece. Senijad Ibričić scored a goal for Bosnia and Herzegovina in the 3–0 win against Luxembourg, and got a yellow card in the 2–0 defeat against France.

On 11 September, Hajduk faced Dinamo in another edition of Croatian derby. Sammir scored for Dinamo in 42nd minute, while Anas Sharbini scored an equalizing goal in 59th minute for the final score 1–1, which maintained the team's unbeaten league record. Five days later, Hajduk played their first game in Europa League group stage away against AEK Athens. In the first half Rafik Djebbour scored for AEK, but Hajduk soon equalized through Ibričić. At the start of the second half Subašić saved a penalty, but his error lead AEK again to advantage when Nikos Liberopoulos scored. Hajduk's second loss in European season was confirmed when Nacho Scocco set the final score 3–1. Hajduk beat Rijeka 1–0 with a goal from Mario Brkljača in 88th minute, despite being a man down as former Rijeka's player Anas Sharbini was sent off at the start of the second half. In the first round of Croatian Cup, Duje Čop scored six goals in the 10–2 victory over Rudar 47. On 25 September, Hajduk won the game against Varaždin 2–0 with goals from Vukušić and Čop. On the last day of September, Hajduk defeated Anderlecht 1–0 at Poljud in a dramatic finish with a goal from Vukušić in the 95th minute.

October
Hajduk started October with a 1–1 draw with Karlovac, which allowed Dinamo to take over the first spot on the league table. Discipline committee suspended Anas Sharbini for two games because of hitting Mario Sačer while on the ground in the game against Varaždin.  Early goal from Vukušić secured the 1–0 win against Slaven Belupo on 16 October. A 2–0 defeat by Zenit St. Petersburg ended Hajduk's streak of 18 consecutive games of scoring at least one goal. Three days later, Hajduk suffered another defeat which ended their unbeaten league record. They lost 2–1 to Cibalia with Vukušić scoring consolation goal from penalty for his 10th league goal. Hajduk was eliminated from the Croatian Cup following a 1–0 defeat in the extra time against Istra 1961 in the second round. As a result of recent poor performances and three successive losses, Poklepović was sacked as manager on 28 October, with assistant manager Joško Španjić taking over for the next fixture. Hajduk barely managed to defeat 2–1 the last placed Hrvatski Dragovoljac with Tomasov providing the late winner. On the same day Goran Vučević was appointed as caretaker manager until the winter break.

November

On 4 November, Hajduk played the second game in group stage against Zenit St. Petersburg on Poljud. Zenit led 3–0 with Jurica Buljat guilty for two penalties, but Marin Ljubičić and Ante Vukušić managed to score for a comforting 3–2 loss. After bad results in Europa League and Croatian Cup, Hajduk won the match against NK Zagreb 4–1 with two goals from Anas Sharbini and goals from Dinko Trebotić and Senijad Ibričić. In the 15th round of Prva HNL they defeated Lokomotiva 1–0 with goal from Mirko Oremuš. A week later they suffered a second defeat by Istra 1961, this time being beaten 2–0. Goalkeeper Danijel Subašić was ruled out for the rest of the year after he underwent knee surgery. The final game of November was a 2–1 win against Osijek, which saw a late own goal by Dino Gavrić.

December

Hajduk opened December with a 3–1 defeat by AEK Athens, which ended their hope for qualifying to knockout stage. They missed some good opportunities in the first half which ended goalless, but AEK triumphed thanks to goals from Nacho Scocco, Kostas Manolas and substitute Ismael Blanco. Jurica Buljat scored a late consolation goal. Last league game of the year was a 3–1 away win against Šibenik, with goals from Tomasov, Ibričić and captain Srđan Andrić who recovered from injury. A 2–0 defeat by Anderlecht followed, which meant Hajduk finished last in their group in Europa League with Zenit and Anderlecht progressing to knockout phase. At the end of 2010 calendar year Hajduk was five points behind Dinamo Zagreb in domestic league and was eliminated from Cup and Europe. Chairman Joško Svaguša was relieved from duty on 19 December, with Josip Grbić stepping in as a temporary replacement. On 28 December, Goran Vučević signed a two-and-a-half-year contract and was officially appointed as Hajduk's manager after his role as caretaker.

January and February

On 13 January, it was announced that Senijad Ibričić was transferred out to Lokomotiv Moscow for 5,000,000 € and 20% of his next transfer fee. Mario Tičinović and Mario Sačer returned from their loan spells in Karlovac and Varaždin. Hajduk approached to sign Ivica Križanac after being released from Zenit earlier this month, but the deal fell through and Križanac joined city rivals RNK Split. Near the end of the month another player left Hajduk, Ivan Strinić was transferred out to Dnipro Dnipropetrovsk for 4,000,000 €. Hajduk sought a replacement for Strinić as they lacked left backs, and soon it was announced that Josip Barišić from Široki Brijeg signed a three-and-a-half-year contract. Srđan Andrić went to Germany for a joint surgery, which would have him ruled out for the remainder of the season but was eventually deemed unnecessary. Goran Vučević appointed top scorer Ante Vukušić as new team captain in the absence of Andrić.

During the mid-season Hajduk went on a two-week tour of Turkey, where they would play four friendly matches. They drew 0–0 with Austria Wien on 29 January, but three days later they beat Obolon Kyiv 3–2 with goals from brothers Sharbini and Vukušić. During the match with Obolon, Mario Brkljača suffered a knee ligament strain, meaning he would be out of action for at least a month. They were held to a 1–1 draw against Dinamo Bucharest as Dinko Trebotić scored the Hajduk goal. Their final game of the tour against Lech Poznań also ended as a 1–1 draw, with Marin Ljubičić scoring the goal. After their return from mid-season preparations in Antalya, Hajduk drew 0–0 with Dugopolje at Stadion Hrvatski vitezovi. On 13 February, Slavia Prague travelled to Split to commemorate the one hundredth anniversary of Hajduk. Slavia won 2–0 at sold-out Poljud with goals from Karol Kisel and Zoran Milutinović. Five days later, Hajduk defeated Dubrovnik 9–0 in the last game of the mid-season campaign. In their first league game after the winter break, Hajduk drew 0–0 against Inter Zaprešić at Poljud.

March
Anas Sharbini was suspended for the upcoming game against Zadar, after he drove his team-mates car on Poljud's athletics track. Hajduk defeated Zadar 2–0 with goals from Srđan Andrić and Marin Ljubičić. On 12 March, Hajduk faced city rival RNK Split. After a goalless first half, RNK Split took the lead thanks to a Hrvoje Vejić own goal. Hajduk recovered and won the game 3–1 with goals coming from Andrić and Vukušić. This was followed by the second derby of the season against Dinamo Zagreb at Maksimir. Milan Badelj and Fatos Bećiraj scored in a 2–0 Dinamo victory, which left Hajduk eight points behind them in the league.

April
At the start of April, Hajduk drew 1–1 with Rijeka, who equalised after Hajduk took the lead through Vukušić. This was followed by a heavy 3–0 defeat against Varaždin. Hajduk's next game against Karlovac ended as the first home defeat of the season. Although Hajduk successfully overturned the early lead with Vejić and Brkljača scoring for 2–1 at half-time, Karlovac staged a second half come-back to win 3–2. After four games without a win, Vučević left Hajduk after having his contract terminated by mutual consent. Two days later, Ante Miše was appointed as Hajduk's manager for the second time, after a spell in 2008–09 season when he also replaced Vučević at the helm. Hajduk beat Slaven Belupo 2–1 after going behind to an Elvis Kokalović goal, with Vukušić scoring the equaliser and Duje Čop scoring the winning goal. On 26 April, 32-year-old Hrvoje Maleš was elected as the new chairman of Hajduk, one of the youngest in club's history. At the end of April, Hajduk suffered their second home defeat of the month after being beaten 2–1 by Cibalia.

May
Hajduk suffered another defeat, a shock 2–0 by the last placed Hrvatski Dragovoljac. Several days later, Hajduk received a 40,000 euros fine from UEFA over conduct of their fans in the away game against Anderlecht. That brought the total of fines to 232,000 euros because of various incidents during their Europa League campaign. In their penultimate game of the season, Hajduk drew 2–2 with NK Zagreb bringing their second place in question. However, the final game of the Prva HNL season was a 2–0 win against Lokomotiva, which saw Hajduk finish the season in second place.

Following the end of the playing season, board decided not to extended contract with manager Ante Miše. On 27 May, it was announced that Krasimir Balakov will take over the helm of Hajduk. Four days later, Balakov officially signed a two-year contract with a possibility of one-year extension if a championship title is won. That same day, it was officially confirmed that Hajduk will play a friendly match against Barcelona, scheduled on 23 July and this way continuing the celebration of the club's centennial. However, Barcelona will be without their main stars who are participating in the Copa América.

First-team squad

Competitions

Overall record

Prva HNL

Classification

Results summary

Results by round

Results by opponent

Source: 2010–11 Croatian First Football League article

Matches

Friendlies

Pre-season

On-season

Mid-season

Croatian Football Super Cup

Source: HRnogomet.com

Prva HNL

Source: HRnogomet.com

Croatian Football Cup

Source: HRnogomet.com

Europa League

Third qualifying round

Play-off round

Group stage

Source: uefa.com

Player seasonal records
Competitive matches only. Updated to games played 21 May 2011.

Top scorers

Source: Competitive matches

Disciplinary record
Includes all competitive matches. Players with 1 card or more included only.

Sources: Prva-HNL.hr, UEFA.com

Appearances and goals

Sources: Prva-HNL.hr, UEFA.com

Transfers

In

Out

Loans out

Sources: nogometni-magazin.com

Notes

References

2010-11
Croatian football clubs 2010–11 season
2010–11 UEFA Europa League participants seasons